Very Severe Cyclonic Storm Lehar was a tropical cyclone that primarily affected the Andaman and Nicobar Islands and the Indian state of Andhra Pradesh. Lehar was the second most intense tropical cyclone of the 2013 season, surpassed by Cyclone Phailin, as well as one of the two relatively strong cyclones that affected Southern India in November 2013, the other being Cyclone Helen.

The origins of Lehar can be tracked back to an area of low pressure that formed in the South China Sea on 18 November. The system slowly drifted westwards and entered the Bay of Bengal, where it quickly consolidated into a depression on 23 November. It moved west-northwest into an improving environment for further development before the system was named Lehar on 24 November, after it had developed into a cyclonic storm and passed over the Andaman and Nicobar Islands into the Bay of Bengal.

Moving along a generally west-northwestward path in the following days, the storm passed over an area having cooler waters and a moderate vertical wind shear. The storm's low-level circulation center (LLCC) started losing its structure, triggering a weakening trend. Lehar rapidly weakened to a Depression on 28 November and its fully exposed LLCC made its second landfall over the coast of Andhra Pradesh near Machilipatnam. The same day, it was last noted as a well marked low-pressure area over Andhra Pradesh.

Extensive preparation was done in the wake of the storm by the authorities of the coastal districts of Andhra Pradesh and Odisha, including the evacuation of 45,000 people in low-lying areas. The storm's rapid weakening before landfall led to no reported fatalities and minimal damage.

Meteorological history

Over the next few days the system moved towards the west-northwest and moved into an extremely favourable environment, for further development while located over the Malay Peninsula during 21 November. The system was subsequently last noted by the JMA during the next day, as it crossed 100°E and moved into the Andaman Sea.

There, it developed a well-defined low-level circulation center (LLCC). The Joint Typhoon Warning Center (JTWC) issued a Tropical Cyclone Formation Alert (TCFA) on the system, assuming that it would intensify further as it moves into warmer sections of the Bay of Bengal. Early on 23 November, the JTWC classified the system as a Tropical Storm, designating it with 05B. A couple of hours later, the India Meteorological Department (IMD) started tracking this system as a Depression. It was initially assigned the code BOB 07. Early the next day, the IMD reported that BOB 07 had reached deep depression status, and immediately afterwards, they upgraded BOB 07 into a cyclonic storm, naming it Lehar. Later that day, Lehar developed a weak microwave eye-like feature.

Lehar made its first landfall south of Port Blair, Andaman and Nicobar, early on 25 November. However, it maintained strength. The cyclone strengthened further and developed strong radial outflow, compensating the moderate vertical wind shear in the region. Following this development, the IMD upgraded Lehar to a Severe Cyclonic Storm. However, multispectral satellite imagery showed that a deep central dense overcast was obscuring the low level circulation. The JTWC had poor confidence in the storm's position and couldn't exactly locate its center. Lehar continued to track in a westerly direction just along the periphery of a subtropical ridge. Early on 26 November, the IMD upgraded Lehar to a Very Severe Cyclonic storm. Meanwhile, they have warned the coastal districts of Andhra Pradesh and Odisha of heavy rainfall and strong winds.

Under the steering influence of the subtropical ridge, Lehar continued to track in a west-northwesterly direction. On passing over cooler waters and experiencing moderate easterly vertical wind shear, the storm started losing intensity. Though deep convection persisted along its well-define center, microwave imagery depicted drier air, restricting moist inflow along the southwestern periphery of the system. On 27 November, the convection around the storm's center started losing its structural organization. A scatterometer pass indicated the elongation of the LLCC with weakening wind field. Thereafter, Leher rapidly weakened into a Depression and made landfall south of Machilipatnam, Andhra Pradesh on 28 November. Increased frictional forces led to the degeneration of the storm into a well-marked low-pressure area, while it moved inland.

Preparations and Impact

Andaman and Nicobar Islands
The cyclone affected the Andaman Islands with heavy rain and gusts. It caused flooding, land slides, road blockage, uprooting of trees and damage to buildings. Over two dozen fisherman went missing, and 2000 people on Little Andaman and 1500 on Havelock Island evacuated. Mayabander and Port Blair recorded heavy rainfall of 243 mm and 213 mm respectively in 24 hours as the cyclone made landfall. Four flights originating from Chennai bound to Port Blair were cancelled due to the cyclone on 25 November while  winds hit the islands.

Andhra Pradesh

The Government of Andhra Pradesh had arranged four military choppers while the National Disaster Response Force (NDRF) deployed 15 teams across the state while another 15 were being arranged for rescue and relief operations immediately after the storm. The four choppers were kept at Visakhapatnam. The state's chief minister Nallari Kiran Kumar Reddy told the district collectors of Visakhapatnam, Srikakulam, Vizianagaram and East Godavari districts to evacuate all the people living in low-lying areas to higher ground. Local state health officials were warned of a potential outbreak of diseases due to extremely heavy rainfall brought by the storm. On 27 November, the state government started evacuations across East Godavari, West Godavari, Krishna and Guntur districts. About 45,000 people were evacuated in total from the districts of Guntur, Krishna, East Godavari and West Godavari. Because the storm rapidly weakened into a minimal depression before landfall, no fatalities or significant damage to property due to cyclone-related events were reported.

Odisha
The Government of Odisha asked all fishermen to return to the coast and then evacuate to safer places on 25 November. The director of the Bhubaneswar Meteorological Centre asked the ports of Paradip and Gopalpur to hoist danger signals in preparation for the storm.

See also

Cyclone Helen
Cyclone Vardah
Cyclone Nilam
Cyclone Jal
Cyclone Phailin

Footnotes

References

External links

 Rapid Response - Cyclone Relief Organisation

2013 disasters in India
2013 North Indian Ocean cyclone season
History of Andhra Pradesh (1947–2014)
Disasters in Andhra Pradesh
Tropical cyclones in India
Very severe cyclonic storms
Tropical cyclones in 2013